Khenj District is the largest district in Panjshir Province with a population of more than 110,000 people. Emerald is mined in this part of Panjshir province. It has about 154 villages, including Jungal Aab Village, Mata Village, Ishkesho Village, Pawat Village, Peshghoor. Khenj District is famous for its mines of emerald. Its people are farmers and miners.

On 5 September 2021, Taliban spokesperson Bilal Karimi said that the 4 districts of Panjshir Province were captured, including Khenj District.

See also
 Districts of Afghanistan

References

Districts of Panjshir Province